Echinacoside is a natural phenol. It is a caffeic acid glycoside from the phenylpropanoid class. It is constituted from a trisaccharide consisting of two glucose and one rhamnose moieties glycosidically linked to one caffeic acid and one dihydroxyphenylethanol (hydroxytyrosol) residue at the centrally situated rhamnose. This water-soluble glycoside is a distinctive secondary metabolite of Echinacea angustifolia and Echinacea pallida (to about 1%) but only occurs in trace amounts in Echinacea purpurea. It is also isolated from Cistanche spp.

It was first isolated by Stoll et al. in 1950 from the roots of Echinacea angustifolia. It shows weak antibiotic activity in vitro against Staphylococcus aureus and Streptococci.

References 

Phenylpropanoid glycosides
Phenylethanoids